Time in the island country of São Tomé and Príncipe is given by Greenwich Mean Time (GMT; UTC±00:00). São Tomé and Príncipe has never observed daylight saving time.

History 
Under Portuguese rule, São Tomé and Príncipe first observed the local mean time UTC+0:26:56 until 1884, when it adopted UTC-0:36:45. GMT (UTC±00:00) was adopted on 1 January 1912. The country briefly adopted West Africa Time (WAT; UTC+01:00) on 1 January 2018, but reverted back on 1 January the following year.

IANA time zone database 
In the IANA time zone database, São Tomé and Príncipe is given one zone in the file zone.tab – Africa/Sao Tome. "ST" refers to the country's ISO 3166-1 alpha-2 country code. Data for São Tomé and Príncipe directly from zone.tab of the IANA time zone database; columns marked with * are the columns from zone.tab itself:

References

External links 
Current time in São Tomé and Príncipe at Time.is
Time in São Tomé and Príncipe at TimeAndDate.com

Geography of São Tomé and Príncipe